Rodney "Jock" Green (born 23 May 1974) is a South African former professional racing cyclist. In 1997 he won the South African National Road Race Championships.

Major results
1997
 1st  Road race, National Road Championships
2002
 1st Stage 6 Tour of Qinghai Lake
2003
 3rd Road race, National Road Championships
2005
 3rd Road race, National Road Championships

References

External links
 

1974 births
Living people
South African male cyclists
Cyclists from Johannesburg
White South African people